Eulonchus halli is a species of small-headed flies in the family Acroceridae. It was named after one of its original collectors, Jack C. Hall, who was also a colleague of the species's author, Evert I. Schlinger, at the University of California.

References

Further reading

 

Acroceridae
Articles created by Qbugbot
Insects described in 1960